The 2011 Pacific-Asia Curling Championships were held from November 19 to 26 at the Nanjing Olympic Sports Center in Nanjing, China. The Pacific Championships acted as the Pacific Zone qualifiers for the 2012 World Curling Championships. The top two women's berths (China and Korea) qualified for the 2012 Ford World Women's Curling Championship in Lethbridge, Alberta, while the top two men's berths (China and New Zealand) qualified for the 2012 Capital One World Men's Curling Championship in Basel, Switzerland.

Men

Teams

Round Robin Standings

Round Robin Results

Draw 1
Saturday, November 19, 14:30

Draw 2
Sunday, November 20, 10:00

Draw 3
Sunday, November 20, 19:00

Draw 4
Monday, November 21, 10:00

Draw 5
Monday, November 21, 19:00

Draw 6
Tuesday, November 22, 10:00

Draw 7
Tuesday, November 22, 19:00

Draw 8
Wednesday, November 23, 10:00

Draw 9
Wednesday, November 23, 19:00

Draw 10
Thursday, November 24, 14:30

Playoffs
Note: First two games of semifinals best-of-five are taken from round-robin games.

Semifinals

Game 3
Friday, November 25, 9:00

Game 4
Friday, November 25, 14:00

Bronze Medal Game
Saturday, November 26, 12:00

Gold Medal Game
Saturday, November 26, 12:00

Women

Teams

Round Robin Standings

Round Robin Results

Draw 1
Saturday, November 19, 19:00

Draw 2
Sunday, November 20, 14:30

Draw 3
Monday, November 21, 14:30

Draw 4
Tuesday, November 22, 14:30

Draw 5
Wednesday, November 23, 10:00

Draw 6
Thursday, November 24, 10:00

Playoffs
Note: First two games of semifinals best-of-five are taken from round-robin games.

Semifinals

Game 3
Friday, November 25, 9:00

Bronze Medal Game
Saturday, November 26, 12:00

Gold Medal Game
Saturday, November 26, 12:00

External links 
 
 
 
 World Curling Federation Results: Women Men
 

Pacific-Asia Curling Championships, 2011
Pacific-Asia Curling Championships
Pacific-Asia Curling Championships
International curling competitions hosted by China